Harley Benton is the house brand for stringed instruments, their amplifiers, and harmonicas of Musikhaus Thomann, a large trader for instruments and audio equipment from Bavaria.

The brand generally targets the budget market, trying to provide higher quality instruments than usually found at the respective price points. For the lower mid-price range (the high end of the price bracket Harley Benton covers), this is achieved by offering features usually reserved for higher-priced instruments, such as torrified (roasted or heat treated) necks, special finishes, or stainless steel frets.

Most Harley Benton products are guitars of various kinds, including bass guitars. Outside of its main business of guitars, the Harley Benton line of instruments also includes banjos, mandolins, ukuleles, diatonic harmonicas, electric violins, electric violas, and lap steel guitars. Harley Benton also sells amplifiers and pedals.

Harley Benton guitars are manufactured in around 20 factories in China, Indonesia and Vietnam.

References

External links 
Harley Benton catalog at Thomann.de

Guitar manufacturing companies
Online retailers of Germany
Musical instrument manufacturing companies of Germany